Neoascia geniculata is a Palearctic species of hoverfly.

Description
External images
For terms see Morphology of Diptera
The 3rd segment of the antenna is rounded-oval (length barely exceeding width). The hypopygium is clothed with white hairs. Abdomen blackish bronzy in male with fairly broad reddish yellow
bands on tergite 3; in female bronzy with black dots over greater part of tergite 3 (latter character distinguishing female of N. geniculata Mg. from female of N. aenea Mg.). Surstyli elongated-oval. Body length 4.0 to 5.0 mm.

Distribution
Scandinavia South to central France. Ireland East through Central Europe, European Russia to Siberia.

Habitat
Wetlands- acid fen, calcareous fen aapamire and raised bog.

Biology
Flies low among vegetation in May to September
Flowers visited include  white umbellifers, Alisma plantago-aquatica, Baldellia ranunculoides , Caltha palustris, Potentilla erecta, Ranunculus.

References

Diptera of Europe
Eristalinae
Insects described in 1822
Taxa named by Johann Wilhelm Meigen